Jerzy Antoni Wilim (14 August 1941 – 7 December 2014) was a Polish footballer (striker) connected most of time with Szombierki Bytom. He played also for Górnik Zabrze and Stade Rennes. Wilim played 8 times in Poland national football team from 1963 to 1969.

References

1941 births
2014 deaths
Polish footballers
Poland international footballers
Górnik Zabrze players
Ekstraklasa players
Ligue 1 players
Stade Rennais F.C. players
Expatriate footballers in France
Expatriate footballers in the Netherlands
Sportspeople from Chorzów
Polish expatriate footballers
SC Telstar players
Szombierki Bytom players
Association football forwards